Agonopterix ligusticella is a moth of the family Depressariidae. It is found in southern France, where it has been recorded from the Pyrenees.

The wingspan is about 18 mm.

References

External links
lepiforum.de

Moths described in 1908
Agonopterix
Moths of Europe